Paul Smith or Paul Smith's may refer to:

Music
 Paul Smith (composer) (1906–1985), American film music composer
 Paul Smith (pianist) (1922–2013), Los Angeles jazz pianist
 Paul Smith (rock vocalist) (born 1979), vocalist and songwriter of British indie rock band Maxïmo Park
 Paul Smith (Christian music singer) (born 1953), American contemporary Christian music performer and songwriter
 Paul Smith (music industry executive) (fl. 1985–present), British record label manager and art event producer
 Paul Reed Smith (born 1956), American luthier and founder/owner of PRS Guitars
 Paul Tillman Smith, American percussionist
 Paul Smith, drummer in the band Dengue Fever

Writing
 Paul Smith (Irish writer) (1920–1997), writer and playwright
 Paul Smith (television writer) (born 1961), British creator of television series and television writer
 Paul Gerard Smith (1894–1968), American screenwriter
 Dale Smith (writer) (born 1976), pseudonym of Paul Dale Smith, British writer and playwright
 Paul Smith (blogger), 21st century British writer and creator of the Twitchhiker Project
 Paul Smith (journalist) (fl. 2002–present), British football journalist
 Paul Jordan-Smith (1885–1971), American journalist, editor, and author

 Paul Smith (historian) (born 1937), British historian of Victorian England
 Paul Chaat Smith, Comanche author and associate curator at the National Museum of the American Indian
 Paul Julian Smith, American historian of Hispanic studies and modern Spain and Mexico

Film, television and radio
 Paul Smith (Australian actor) (born 1968), starred in the Australian sitcom Hey Dad...!
 Paul Smith (animator) (1906–1980), American animator and director best known for his work in Woody Woodpecker cartoons
 Paul L. Smith (1936–2012), American actor and comedian
 Paul Smith (American actor, born 1929), American comic character actor
 Paul W. Smith (born 1953), American talk radio host in Michigan

Arts
 Paul Smith (artist) (1921–2007), American typewriter artist
 Paul Smith (fashion designer) (born 1946), British fashion designer
 Paul Smith (comics) (born 1953), American comic book artist
 Paul M. Smith (photographer) (born 1969), British photographer and educator
 Paul J. Smith (arts administrator) (1931–2020), American arts administrator, curator, and artist

Science and academics
 M. Paul Smith (fl. 1992–present), British paleontologist
 Paul Althaus Smith (1900–1980), American mathematician
 Paul Smith (academic) (born 1954), British academic and cultural critic

Sports

Association footballers
 Paul Smith (footballer, born 1954), English football player for Huddersfield Town and Cambridge United
 Paul Smith (footballer, born 1962), Scottish football player and manager
 Paul Smith (footballer, born 1964), English football player for Sheffield United, Port Vale and Lincoln City
 Paul Smith (footballer, born 1967), English football player for Torquay United, Brentford and Bristol Rovers
 Paul Smith (footballer, born 1971), English football player for Gillingham and Brentford
 Paul Smith (footballer, born 22 January 1976), English football player for Burnley, Hartlepool United and Sheffield Wednesday
 Paul Smith (footballer, born 25 January 1976), English football player for Lincoln City
 Paul Smith (footballer, born 1979), goalkeeper currently at Southend United
 Paul Smith (footballer, born 1991), English football player for Chester City and Barrow

American football
 Paul Smith (defensive end) (1945–2000), former NFL defensive end
 Paul Smith (fullback) (born 1978), former NFL fullback
 Paul Smith (quarterback) (born 1984), former college quarterback
 Paul G. Smith (1882–1971), college football head coach

Other
 Paul Smith (boxer) (born 1982), British professional boxer
 Paul Smith (cricketer, born 1820) (1820–?), English cricketer
 Paul Smith (cricketer, born 1964), English cricketer
 Paul Smith (cricketer, born 1975), former English cricketer
 Paul Smith (first baseman) (1931–2019), American baseball player
 Paul Smith (outfielder) (1888–1958), American baseball player
 Paul Smith (rugby league) (born 1969), Australian rugby league player
 Paul Smith (racing driver) (born 1955), British former racing driver
 Paul Smith (drift driver) (born 1980), British drift driver

Other fields
 Paul Smith (1825–1912), born Apollos Smith, founder of one of the first resorts in the Adirondacks, New York
 Paul Smith (clergy) (born 1935), African-American Presbyterian minister
 Paul M. Smith (born 1955), American attorney whose most notable case is Lawrence v. Texas
 Paul Ray Smith (1969–2003), US Army sergeant and Medal of Honor recipient
 Paul F. Smith (1915–2014), US Army general
 Paul Smith, founder of British motorist lobby group Safe Speed in 2001

See also
 Paul Smith's College, a private college in New York
 Paul Smith's Electric Light and Power and Railroad Company Complex, a district on the National Register of Historic Places in Franklin County, New York
 Paul Smith's Hotel, Brighton, New York
 Paul Smiths, New York, a hamlet in the town of Brighton
 Paul Smyth (disambiguation)